Villa La Angostura (Spanish for Town of the Narrowing) is a town located in the Los Lagos Department in the south of the Argentine province of Neuquén, on the northwest shore of the Nahuel Huapi Lake.

Nestled in the northern part of the Nahuel Huapi National Park, and surrounded by lakes, forests and mountains, it is considered to be one of the most beautiful locations in the mountainous parts of Patagonia; earning it the nickname Garden of Patagonia (Spanish: Jardín de la Patagonia).

Just located a couple of kilometers away from the border with Chile through the Cardenal Antonio Samoré Pass and with other nearby places such as Bariloche and San Martín de los Andes, it forms a popular tourist corridor during both summer and winter.

Geography and climate
The town is located halfway between the cities of San Martín de los Andes and Bariloche, inside the Nahuel Huapi National Park, very close to the isthmus of the Quetrihue Peninsula, where the Los Arrayanes National Park and its arrayanes (Luma apiculata) forest is located. The town is located nearby Cardenal Antonio Samoré Pass that links it with Osorno in Chile.

The area's climate is with marked alpine characteristics despite relatively low altitudes. Summers are known for being sunny and pleasant, with high temperatures usually between 18 °C (65 °F) and 25 °C (77 °F), but with cold nights between 2 °C (35 °F) and 9 °C (48 °F). Temperatures will reach 30 °C (86 °F) only a couple of times every year, and night frost happens occasionally during the summer as well. There are often long stretches of sunny, windy weather; however, when the weather gets locked in a stormy pattern, it can remain so for several days or weeks: temperatures will stay cold (10 °C to 18 °C, or 50 °F to 65 °F) and summer sleet is not unprecedented.
March brings more frequent frost, but also nice stretches of sunny weather. The average high temperature is 19 °C, the low is 4 °C, occasionally 30 °C can be reached, and temperatures may fall to -5 °C. The most radical change occurs sometime during the month of April, when Villa La Angostura first gets in the path of a "train of Pacific storms": in the end, total precipitation for the month averages . The average high is 14 °C (57 °F), the low is 2 °C or 35 °F(the nighttime change is small due to increased cloudiness)and by late April any cloudless night will be frosty.
It is also often the month of the first significant snowfall. High temperatures are usually around 9 °C or 48 °F, lows average 1 °C or 33 °F, sometimes temperatures can reach -10 °C or 14 °F. June, July and August are the core of the winter in Villa La Angostura, when the average high ranges from 5 °C to 8 °C (40 °F to 46 °F) and lows from 0 °C to -2 °C (32 °F to 28 °F). Storms are very frequent and usually bring a mixture of rain, snow and sleet; overall precipitation averages  to  monthly for the period, falling mostly as snow in the mountains around the city. Snowstorms can sometimes be heavy (over 20 cm or 8 inches), and extreme cold waves might bring temperatures down to -18 °C (0 °F) or lower; however, long stretches of intense frost are rare as Pacific storms always strike the area with milder, moist air.
In September, the storminess diminishes slightly ( in total), and high temperatures reach an average of 11 °C, although low temperatures only increase to -1 °C. By the end of the month, there might be stretches of pleasant weather and comfortable temperatures, but the month also marks the beginning of the windiest part of the year.
October is extremely variable, going back and forth between periods of extremely windy, but sunny weather, and freak cold snaps that bring night temperatures below -5 °C (23 °F) and mixtures of sleet and snow. Average highs are 14 °C (57 °F), lows are 1 °C (33 °F), and precipitation reaches . November brings springlike weather, much lower precipitation but strong winds and wild variations in temperature. Averages are 17 °C in the afternoon and 3 °C at night, but it is not unusual to have a day of rain and sleet with a high below 5 °C (40 °F), or a day with sunny weather and a high of 25 °C (77 °F). Finally, December is a transition between spring and summer: winds are still very strong and freak variations occur, but the average high of 20 °C (68 °F) and the low of 5 °C (40 °F) are more typical of summer weather.

Nearby La Angostura is the Cerro Bayo and its ski centre. The resort's base, at only  higher than the city, usually only sees sufficient snow cover for a few weeks in midwinter, following large storms. The view from the top is impressive, especially toward the west, across Nahuel Huapi lake, with the majestic, heavily glaciated Cerro Tronador, clearly visible.

Tourism

La Angostura is considered among the main attractions of Argentina's Andean Patagonia not only because of the wooden town itself, but also because of the beauty of its sights. On its west side is the Nahuel Huapi Lake, and to the east, the Correntoso Lake.
Both lakes are connected by the Correntoso River, which, with 200 meters of length, is one of the sport fishing destinations around La Angostura.

The architecture of the town follows a stylized Alpine wooden style similar to that of Bariloche's city centre.
There are shops and restaurants of artisanal products such as chocolate, beer and trout. It is categorised as a mountain village, even though it has approximately 11,000 inhabitants.

2011 volcanic ash
In June 2011, Villa La Angostura was declared a disaster area due to the massive layer of ash dumped on the community by the eruption to the west in Chile.

References

External links 
History, pictures and maps (Spanish)
Tourist information site

Populated places in Neuquén Province
Ski areas and resorts in Argentina
Populated places established in 1932
Tourism in Argentina
Populated lakeshore places in Argentina
Nahuel Huapi National Park
Cities in Argentina
Argentina
Neuquén Province